Oleksandra Mykolaivna Kononova (born 27 February 1991) is a Ukrainian Paralympic skier. She won three medals at the 2010 Paralympics and became the 2010 Ukrainian sports personality of the year.

Personal life
Kononova was born in Brovary in 1991. She had a condition when she was a young child that meant that her right arm did not develop as well as her other arm. Kononova was an orphan brought up by her grandmother. When she was ten she met some youths who were using in-line roller skates. Kononova came from a poor background, she was bullied due to her disability and remembered being unhappy. She found out that the people she had met in the park were not roller skaters but a team training using skates for cross-country skiing. She decided to take up the sport.

Career
Training on skates during the spring and summer seasons she found that her disability did not effect her ability to succeed at skiing and she was achieving national positions by the time she was eighteen. Her first trainer was Anatoliy Zadvineyev.

When Kononova was nineteen she was chosen to travel from her home in Kyiv Oblast to represent her country at the paralympics in Canada. She was part of a Ukrainian team who had been fourth at the last paralympics and who hoped to better their position. Kononova won a gold medal for the Ukraine in the standing biathlon at the Paralympic games in Vancouver in 2010. She competed at the games as the reigning world champion. Kononova won the best debut at the games adding to the nineteen medals that the Ukraine took in Vancouver.

She won three gold medals and a silver medal at the 2010 Paralympics and became the 2010 Ukrainian sports personality of the year. She won significant prize money from the Ukrainian government and was credited with assisting in changing the Ukrainian's attitudes to disability in general.

Kononova competed at the IPC Nordic Biathlon World Cup in Vuokatti in Finland in 2014. On the final day of the World Cup she was the only non-Russian to claim a gold medal. She was in the Ukrainian biathlon team at the Sochi 2014 Paralympic Winter Games.

She won the gold medal in the women's 6km standing biathlon event at the 2021 World Para Snow Sports Championships held in Lillehammer, Norway. She also won the bronze medal in the women's 10km standing biathlon event.

References

External links
 

1991 births
Living people
Ukrainian female biathletes
Paralympic gold medalists for Ukraine
Paralympic silver medalists for Ukraine
Paralympic cross-country skiers of Ukraine
Paralympic biathletes of Ukraine
Cross-country skiers at the 2010 Winter Paralympics
Cross-country skiers at the 2022 Winter Paralympics
Paralympic medalists in cross-country skiing
Paralympic medalists in biathlon
Biathletes at the 2010 Winter Paralympics
Biathletes at the 2014 Winter Paralympics
Biathletes at the 2022 Winter Paralympics
Medalists at the 2010 Winter Paralympics
Medalists at the 2014 Winter Paralympics
Medalists at the 2022 Winter Paralympics
People from Brovary
Sportspeople from Kyiv Oblast
21st-century Ukrainian women